Amran may refer to:

'Amran Governorate, Yemen
'Amran (Arabic: عمران) small city in western central Yemen, capital of the 'Amran Governorate
Amran, Gujarat, a village in Jamnagar district, Gujarat, India
Amran District, Yemen

People with the name
Edmond Amran El Maleh
Amran Abdul Ghani
Khwaja Amran

See also
Amram, father of Moses and Aaron